Rob Ryan (born 1962) is a British  visual artist who specialises in Papercutting and screen-printing. He is known for his detailed paper cut outs. His artwork has featured in Vogue, Elle, and Stylist. He has also collaborated with fashion designer Paul Smith.

Ryan has illustrated book and album covers, including John Connolly's novel The Book of Lost Things, Erasure's album Nightbird, Louis de Bernières short-story collection Notwithstanding and Dara Horn's novel The World to Come. His first book, This Is for You, was published in October 2007 by Hodder & Stoughton; it consists of a fairy tale told through his paper cut-out art and explores themes of love and loneliness. Ryan also creates the Global Gift greeting cards for the charity Trocaire.

Personal life
Ryan was born in 1962 in Cyprus in Paphos to Irish parents Doris and Buddy Ryan who divorced in 1966. He is the youngest of three brothers and his father was an RAF mess hall officer. He studied at Trent Polytechnic and has a Master of Arts in printmaking from the Royal College of Art. He graduated from the Royal College of Art in 1987.

He currently works from his studio in London, where he lives with his wife and two daughters.

References

External links
 Rob Ryan (official website)

Living people
1962 births
Paper artists
Alumni of the Royal College of Art
Alumni of Nottingham Trent University
English printmakers
English illustrators